Thermoniphas is an Afrotropical genus of butterflies in the family Lycaenidae.

Species
Thermoniphas alberici (Dufrane, 1945)
Thermoniphas albocaerulea  Stempffer, 1956
Thermoniphas bibundana  (Grünberg, 1910)
Thermoniphas caerulea  Stempffer, 1956
Thermoniphas colorata  (Ungemach, 1932)
Thermoniphas distincta  (Talbot, 1935)
Thermoniphas fontainei  Stempffer, 1956
Thermoniphas fumosa  Stempffer, 1952
Thermoniphas kamitugensis  (Dufrane, 1945)
Thermoniphas kigezi  Stempffer, 1956
Thermoniphas leucocyanea  Clench, 1961
Thermoniphas micylus (Cramer, 1780)
Thermoniphas plurilimbata  Karsch, 1895
Thermoniphas stempfferi  Clench, 1961
Thermoniphas togara  (Plötz, 1880)

References

 Seitz, A. Die Gross-Schmetterlinge der Erde 13: Die Afrikanischen Tagfalter. Plate XIII 74

 
Lycaenidae genera
Taxa named by Ferdinand Karsch